Keep Cool may refer to:

 Keep Cool (film), a 1997 Chinese black comedy directed by Zhang Yimou
 Keep Cool (board game), a German-made global warming board game
 Keep Cool Records an American record label